Zelyony Bor is an urban locality (a work settlement) under the administrative jurisdiction of the krai town of Minusinsk, in Krasnoyarsk Krai, Russia. Population:

References

Urban-type settlements in Krasnoyarsk Krai
Minusinsk Urban Okrug